The Ngurimi are a Bantu ethnolinguistic group based in northern Tarime District and Serengeti District of Mara Region of Tanzania near the border with Kenya.  In 1987 the Ngurimi population was estimated to number 32,000 .

Ethnic groups in Tanzania
Indigenous peoples of East Africa